The Rothberg Institute For Childhood Diseases is a non-profit organization dedicated to finding a cure for childhood diseases such as Tuberous Sclerosis Complex (TSC). The organization was founded by Jonathan Rothberg and his wife in 2002. 

Located in Guilford, Connecticut, the organization was responsible for the CommunityTSC distributed computing project.

CommunityTSC
CommunityTSC Drug Design Optimization Lab (D2OL) was a distributed computing project developed by the Institute to test drug candidates interaction with a target molecule that is essential to the spread of the disease under scrutiny. By evaluating the energy level released by binding a small molecule drug candidate to the surface of a larger Target molecule (D2OL) determines the fitness of the particular candidate to a region of the Target structure known as the Active Site. This process is referred to as docking the drug candidate to the target. D2OL ended on April 15, 2009.

References

External links
Rothberg Institute website

Guilford, Connecticut
Non-profit organizations based in Connecticut
Distributed computing projects